The WAGR M class was a two-member class of 2-6-0 steam locomotives operated by the Western Australian Government Railways (WAGR) between 1876 and 1911.

History
The M class engines were built in 1875 by Kitson & Co, Leeds as the first two items of motive power for the Northampton railway line, the first government railway in Western Australia. They were delivered to the port of Geraldton, the western terminus of the line, in 1876.

In 1893, both engines were relocated to Fremantle for use on the Eastern Railway. M24 was sold to Whittaker Bros in 1907, and M23 to Bunning Bros in 1911.

Class list

Namesakes
The M class designation was reused in the 1910s for the M class of Garratt locomotives and again in the 1970s when the M class diesel locomotives entered service.

See also

History of rail transport in Western Australia
List of Western Australian locomotive classes

References

Notes

Cited works

External links

Kitson locomotives
Railway locomotives introduced in 1876
M WAGR class (1875)
2-6-0 locomotives
3 ft 6 in gauge locomotives of Australia
Freight locomotives